James Monachino (July 9, 1929 – April 28, 2021) was an American football halfback in the National Football League for the San Francisco 49ers and Washington Redskins.  He played college football at the University of California, Berkeley and was drafted in the twelfth round of the 1951 NFL Draft.

References

1929 births
2021 deaths
Players of American football from Cleveland
American football halfbacks
California Golden Bears football players
San Francisco 49ers players
Washington Redskins players